Steudnera is a genus of flowering plants in the family Araceae. It is native to southern China, the Himalayas, and Indochina. The genus was first described by Karl Koch in 1862. The genus is also believed to be closely related to Remusatia.

Species
Steudnera assamica Hook.f. - Arunachal Pradesh, Assam
Steudnera capitellata Hook.f. - Myanmar
Steudnera colocasiifolia K.Koch - Yunnan, Guangxi, Assam, Bangladesh, Indochina
Steudnera discolor W.Bull - Assam, Bangladesh, Myanmar, Thailand
Steudnera gagei K.Krause - Assam
Steudnera griffithii (Schott) Hook.f. - Assam, Myanmar, Yunnan
Steudnera henryana Engl. - Yunnan, Laos, Vietnam
Steudnera kerrii Gagnep.  - Guangxi, Laos, Vietnam, Thailand

References

Aroideae
Araceae genera